Joshua Henshaw was a member of the Massachusetts Governor's Council. He was living in the Samuel Dexter House when George Washington spent the night on his way to New York following the Evacuation of Boston.

References

Works cited

Year of birth missing
Year of death missing
Politicians from Dedham, Massachusetts
Members of the Massachusetts Governor's Council